Thomas Richardson was a Scottish cartographer in the 18th century.

The "Manor" Map of 1771 now in the Museum of Richmond, London, bears the following inscription:
"Plan of the Royal Manor of Richmond, otherwise West Sheen, in the county of Surry. Taken under the direction of Peter Burrell Esq. His Majesty's Surveyor General in the year 1771 by Thomas Richardson in York Street, Cavendish Square, London."

References 

Year of death missing
Year of birth missing
Scottish cartographers
18th-century cartographers
18th-century Scottish people